Julio Rodolfo García (born 23 November 1945) is a Guatemalan footballer. He competed at the 1968 Summer Olympics and the 1976 Summer Olympics.

References

External links
 

1945 births
Living people
Guatemalan footballers
Guatemala international footballers
Olympic footballers of Guatemala
Footballers at the 1968 Summer Olympics
Footballers at the 1976 Summer Olympics
Sportspeople from Guatemala City
Comunicaciones F.C. players
Association football goalkeepers